This article is about communications systems in the Marshall Islands.

In 2010, the Majuro and Kwajalein Atoll were connected to the Internet using the HANTRU-1 undersea communications cable to provide high-speed bandwidth.  Faster Internet service was rolled out to Majuro and Ebeye on April 1, 2010.

The majority of communication is under the responsibility of Marshall Islands National Telecommunications Authority.

Publications
Newspapers: 

 Marshall Islands Journal: tabloid
 The Marshall Islands Journal is a dual language, once a week publication. It is the newspaper of record for the Marshall Islands.

Telephone

Telephones:

 main lines in use: 3,000 (1994)
 mobile cellular: 280 (1994)

Telex services:

 domestic: Majuro Atoll and Ebeye and Kwajalein islands have regular, seven-digit, direct-dial telephones; other islands interconnected by shortwave radio, telephone (used mostly for government purposes)
 international: satellite earth stations – 2 Intelsat (Pacific Ocean); US Government satellite communications system on Kwajalein

Radio
Radio broadcast stations: AM 3, FM 4, shortwave 0 (1998)

Stations included are:
 V7AB 1098 (State-run, by Marshall Islands Broadcasting Company, national coverage)
 V7AFN 1224 Kwajalein (military, NPR)
 V7EG 1170 Micronesia Heatwave (commercial) (formerly V7RR AM 1557)
 V7EMON 95.5
 V7AB 97.9
 V7EAGLE 99.9 Kwajalein (military, Country)
 V7DJ 101.1 Kwajalein (military, Active Rock)
 AFN 102.1 Kwajalein (military, Hot AC)
 V7AA 104.1 - Religious

Television
Television broadcast stations: 3 (of which two are US military stations) (1997) (stations are: MBC-TV, CPN (AFN) – Central Pacific Network (Channel 1) - CPN (AFN) – Central Pacific Network (Channel 2))

Internet
Internet Service Providers: 1

Top level domain: The TLD of the Marshall Islands is .mh. However, it's registrar has been essentially defunct, with their website not resolving.

Notes

 
Marshall
Marshall